Sarah Wyss (born, 3 August 1988, Basel) is a Swiss politician of the Social Democratic Party of Switzerland (SP). Since December 2020 she is a member of the National Council of Switzerland.

Education and early life 
She was born in Basel, but was raised in Münchenstein, Canton Basel-Landschaft. After initially having studied economic sciences and history, she earned a Master of Sciences in European Studies from the Europa Institute at the University of Basel in 2015.

Political career 
Her political career she began with the SP. She presided the cantonal youth wing of the SP, the Young Socialists of Canton Basel-Stadt between 2009 and 2012. In 2012, she was elected as a member of the Grand Council of Basel Stadt, a post she assumed in 2013 and was re-elected in 2016 and 2020. In November 2020, she announced she would not assume the post and succeed Beat Jans in the National Council instead.

Views 
She focuses in health care politics and advocates for regional health care policies instead of cantonal ones.

References 

21st-century Swiss women politicians
21st-century Swiss politicians
1988 births
Social Democratic Party of Switzerland politicians
Living people
Members of the National Council (Switzerland)
Politicians from Basel-Stadt